Oloessa poeta is a species of beetle in the family Cerambycidae. It was described by Dillon and Dillon in 1952. It is known from Fiji.

References

Cyrtinini
Beetles described in 1952